Karabudjan is a Spanish–Colombian thriller television series starring Hugo Silva and Marta Nieto. Produced by Dynamo Producciones and Notro TV, it originally aired in 2010 on Antena 3.

Premise 
Mostly set in between Colombia and Madrid, the fiction follows Diego Salgado, a successful business executive with a dark secret from his past hidden under the guise of his successful persona. His troubled past comes to haunt him after the best friend (María Ugarte) of his sister disappears.

Cast 
 Hugo Silva as Diego Salgado.
 Marta Nieto as Ana Muro, Chief Police Officer charged with the investigation on María's whereabouts.
 Carolina Gómez as Paula, television presenter.
 Víctor Clavijo as Dani, Diego's best friend.
  as Enrique, Diego's father.
  es María Ugarte.
  as Elena, Diego's sister.
 Pere Brasó as Adrián, Ana's working colleague.
  as Silvia, María and Elena's friend.

Production and release 
A joint Spanish–Colombian co-production, Karabudjan was produced by Notro TV and Dynamo Producciones. Written by Carlos de Pando, Jon Sagalá and Jacobo Bergareche, four episodes were directed by Koldo Serra and two by Felipe Martínez Amador. It was shot on natural locations in Colombia (the bulk of the production, including footage for the Senegalese and Spanish fictional settings) and Spain. The series consists of 6 episodes featuring a running time of around 70 minutes.

The first episode premiered on Antena 3 on 6 April 2010, earning 2,592,000 viewers and a 14.2% audience share. Following a drop in the viewership figures and pending the airing of the two last episodes, Antena 3 decided to program the broadcasting of the remaining two episodes on a back-to-back basis for 4 May 2010, which earned a combined average of 1,636,000 viewers and a 11.1% share.

References 

Spanish thriller television series
2010 Spanish television series debuts
2010 Spanish television series endings
2010s Spanish drama television series
Television shows filmed in Colombia
Television shows set in Colombia
Television shows set in Madrid
Television shows set in Senegal
Antena 3 (Spanish TV channel) network series
Spanish-language television shows